This list of Canadian Jews includes notable Canadian Jews or Canadians of Jewish descent, arranged by field of activity.

Academic figures

Biology and medicine

 Eric Berne (1910–1970), psychiatrist
 John Bienenstock (1936– ), immunologist
 Daniel Borsuk  (1978– ), plastic surgeon
 Éric Cohen (1958– ), molecular virologist
 Max Cynader  (1947– ), ophthalmologist and neuroscientist
 Dorothy Dworkin (1889–1976), nurse and founder of Mount Sinai Hospital, Toronto
 William Feindel  (1918–2014), neurosurgeon
 Samuel Freedman  (1928– ), clinical immunologist
 Phil Gold  (1936– ), medical researcher
 Larry Goldenberg  (1953– ), medical researcher
 Carl Goresky  (1932–1996), physician and scientist
 Michael Hayden  (1951– ), geneticist
 Sara Hestrin-Lerner (1918–2017), physiologist
 Abram Hoffer (1917–2009), physician and psychiatrist
 Charles Hollenberg  (1930–2003), physician and medical researcher
 Harold Kaplan (1928–1998), psychiatrist
 George Karpati  (1934–2009), neurologist
 Gideon Koren (1947– ), pediatrician
 Gabor Maté  (1944– ), physician
 Harry Medovy  (1904–1995), paediatrician
 Henry Morgentaler  (1923–2013), doctor and abortion activist
 Richard Goldbloom  (1924–2021), paediatrician
 Mel Rosenberg (1951– ), microbiologist
 Sydney Segal  (1920–1997), pediatrician and neonatologist
 Louis Siminovitch  (1920–2021),  molecular biologist
 Nahum Sonenberg  (1946– ), microbiologist and biochemist
 Ralph Steinman (1943–2011), medical researcher; Nobel Prize in Medicine (2011)
 Karl Stern (1906–1975), neurologist and psychiatrist
 Mark Wainberg  (1945–2017), HIV/AIDS researcher
 Zena Werb (1945–2020), cell biologist

Computing and mathematics

 Dror Bar-Natan (1966– ), topologist
 Yoshua Bengio (1964– ), computer scientist
 David Borwein (1924–2021), mathematician
 Jonathan Borwein (1951–2016), mathematician
 Peter Borwein (1953–2020), mathematician
 Nathan Divinsky (1925–2012), mathematician and chess master
 Ian Goldberg (1973– ), cryptographer
 Calvin Gotlieb  (1921–2016), computer scientist
 Michael Gurstein (1944–2017), computer scientist
 Israel Halperin  (1911–2007), algebraist
 Hans Heilbronn (1908–1975), mathematician
 William Kahan (1933– ), computer scientist and mathematician; Turing Award (1989)
 Irving Kaplansky (1917–2006), mathematician
 Yael Karshon (1964– ), symplectic geometer
 Cecilia Krieger (1894–1974), mathematician
 Nathan Mendelsohn  (1917–2006), combinatorialist and group theorist
 Pierre Milman (1945– ), algebraic and differential geometer
 Louis Nirenberg (1925–2020), analyst; Abel Prize (2015)
 Anatol Rapoport (1911–2007), applied mathematician
 Robert Steinberg (1922–2014), algebraist
 George Zames (1934–1997), control theorist

Engineering

 Norbert Berkowitz  (1924–2001), engineering researcher
 Gregory Chamitoff (1962– ), NASA astronaut and engineer
 Valery Fabrikant (1940– ), mechanical engineer and convicted murderer
 Charles Hershfield (1910–1990), structural engineer
 Josef Kates (1921–2018), engineer
 Leon Katz (1924–2015), biomedical engineer
 Cyril Leonoff (1925–2016), geotechnical engineer

History
 Irving Abella  (1940– ), historian
 Norman Cantor (1929–2004), historian
 Natalie Zemon Davis  (1928– ), historian
 David Feuerwerker (1912–1980), historian
 Jan Grabowski (1962– ), historian and writer
 Jack Granatstein  (1939– ), political and military historian
 Ronald Hamowy (1937–2012), historian and political theorist
 Gabriel Kolko (1932–2014), historian
 Michael Marrus  (1941– ), historian
 David Noble (1945–2010), historian of technology
 Derek Penslar (1958– ), historian
 Harold Troper (1942– ), historian
 Daniel Woolf (1958– ), historian

Humanities
 Gregory Baum (1923–2017), priest and theologian
 Leon Edel (1907–1997), literary critic; Pulitzer Prize (1963)
 Archie Green (1917–2009), folklorist
 Marvin Herzog (1927–2013), professor of Yiddish language
 Norma Joseph (1944– ), professor of Jewish Studies
 Barbara Kirshenblatt-Gimblett (1942– ), scholar of Jewish studies 
 Allan Nadler (1954– ), professor of Jewish studies
 Adele Reinhartz (1953– ), professor of Biblical literature
 David Roskies (1948– ), literary scholar
 Abraham de Sola (1825–1882), professor of Semitic languages and literature
 Ruth Wisse (1936– ), professor of Yiddish literature

Philosophy
 Howard Adelman  (1938– ), philosopher
 Gerald Cohen (1941–2009), political philosopher
 S. Morris Engel (1931– ), philosopher
 Emil Fackenheim (1916–2003), philosopher and theologian
 Raymond Klibansky  (1905–2005), historian of philosophy
 Lou Marinoff (1951– ), philosopher
 Roger Nash (1946– ), philosopher
 Michael Neumann (1946– ), philosopher
 Jay Newman (1948–2007), philosopher
 Leonard Peikoff (1933– ), philosopher
 Hillel Steiner (1942– ), political philosopher

Physics and chemistry

 Isaac Abella (1934–2016), physicist
 Sidney Altman (1939–2022), molecular biologist; Nobel Prize in Chemistry (1989)
 Alfred Bader  (1924–2018), chemist
 Myer Bloom (1928–2016), physicist
 Jacques Distler (1961– ), physicist
 Ursula Franklin  (1921–2016) metallurgist and physicist
 Helen Freedhoff (1940–2017), theoretical physicist
 Stanton Friedman (1934–2019 ), nuclear physicist and ufologist
 Jack Halpern (1925–2018), inorganic chemist
 Shlomo Hestrin (1914–1962), biochemist
 Leopold Infeld (1898–1958), physicist
 Werner Israel  (1931–2022), physicist
 Martin Kamen (1913–2002), chemist
 Leon Katz  (1909–2004), physicist
 Victoria Kaspi  (1967– ), astrophysicist
 Lawrence Krauss (1954– ), theoretical physicist
 David Levy (1948– ), astronomer
 Rudolph Marcus (1923– ), chemist; Nobel Prize in Chemistry (1997)
 Maya Paczuski (1963– ), physicist
 John Polanyi  (1929– ), chemist; Nobel Prize in Chemistry (1986)
 Juda Hirsch Quastel  (1899–1987), biochemist
 Sara Seager (1971– ), astronomer
 Moshe Shapiro (1944–2013), chemist and physicist
 David Shugar (1915–2015), physicist
 Louis Slotin (1910–1946), physicist and chemist
 Joe Schwarcz, science writer and chemist
 Theodore Sourkes  (1919–2015), biochemist
 Rudolf Vrba (1924–2006), biochemist
 Leo Yaffe  (1916–1997), nuclear chemist and university administrator

Social sciences

 Bernard Avishai (1949– ), professor of business
 Ellen Bialystok  (1948– ), psychologist
 Paul Bloom (1963– ), psychologist
 Reuven Brenner (1947– ), economist
 Michel Chossudovsky (1946– ), economist
 Stanley Coren (1942– ), psychologist
 Kurt Freund (1914–1996), sexologist
 Rochel Gelman (1942– ), psychologist
 Reva Gerstein  (1917–2020), psychologist 
 Erving Goffman (1922–1982), sociologist
 Myrna Gopnik, (1935–), linguist
 Ida Halpern  (1910–1987), ethnomusicologist 
 Samuel Hollander  (1937– ), economist
 Gad Horowitz (1936– ), political scientist
 Helmut Kallmann  (1922–2012), musicologist
 Ivan Kalmar (1948– ), anthropologist
 James Laxer (1941–2018), political economist
 Daniel Levitin (1957– ), cognitive psychologist
 Ronald Melzack  (1929–2019), psychologist
 Henry Mintzberg  (1939– ), business theorist
 Sylvia Ostry  (1927–2020), economist
 Leo Panitch (1945–2020), political scientist
 Norman Penner (1921–2009), political scientist and historian
 Steven Pinker (1954– ), cognitive psychologist and linguist
 Susan Pinker (1957– ), psychologist and writer
 Frances Fox Piven (1932– ), political scientist 
 Gad Saad (1964– ),  evolutionary psychologist
 Myron Scholes (1941– ), financial economist; Nobel Prize in Economics (1997)
 Vera Shlakman (1909–2017), economist
 Lionel Tiger, anthropologist
 Jacob Viner (1892–1970), economist
 Kenneth Zucker (1950– ), psychologist and sexologist
 Shlomo Weber (1949– ), economist

University administration
 Isaac Hellmuth (1819–1901), founder of the University of Western Ontario
 Myer Horowitz  (1932–2022), president of the University of Alberta
 Sheldon Levy (1949– ), president and vice-chancellor of Ryerson University
 Jack N. Lightstone (1951– ), provost of Concordia University; president of Brock University
 Frederick Lowy  (1933– ), president and vice-chancellor of Concordia University
 Arnold Naimark  (1933– ), president of the University of Manitoba
 Mordechai Rozanski (1946– ), president of the University of Guelph
 Bernard Shapiro  (1935– ), principal and vice-chancellor of McGill University
 Harold Shapiro (1935– ), president of Princeton University
 Daniel Woolf (1958– ), principal and vice-chancellor of Queen's University
 Max Wyman (1916–1991), president of the University of Alberta

Activists

 Manuel Batshaw (1915–2016), social worker
 Marjorie Blankstein , community activist
 Judy Feld Carr  (1938– ), human rights activist
 Sabina Citron (1928– ), activist and author
 Martha Cohen  (1920–2015), community activist
 Betty Dubiner (1912–2008), disabilities activist
 Bernie Farber (1951– ), Jewish community leader and social activist
 Abraham Feinberg (1899–1986), human rights activist.
 Shulamith Firestone (1945–2012), radical feminist
 Ruth Frankel  (1903–1989), activist
 Howard Galganov (1950– ), political activist
 Saul Hayes  (1906–1980), activist
 Goldie Hershon (1941– ), activist and Jewish community leader
 Kalmen Kaplansky  (1912–1997), human rights activist
 Hillel Neuer (1969– ), executive director of UN Watch
 Judy Rebick (1945– ), political activist
 Dorothy Reitman  (1932– ), activist
 Léa Roback (1903–2000), social activist and feminist
 Irv Rubin (1945–2002), Kahanist activist
 David Shentow (1925–2017), Holocaust educator

Artists

Architects and designers

 Hans Blumenfeld  (1892–1988), architect and city planner
 Benjamin Brown (1890–1974), architect
 Jack Diamond  (1932–2022), architect
 Frank Gehry  (1929– ), architect
 Gregory Henriquez (1963– ), architect 
 Phyllis Lambert  (1927– ), architect and philanthropist
 Cornelia Oberlander  (1921–2021), landscape architect
 Peter Oberlander  (1922–2008), architect
 Moshe Safdie  (1938– ), architect
 Arnold Scaasi (1930–2015), fashion designer

Fine arts

 Omer Arbel (1976– ), sculptor and designer
 Aba Bayefsky (1923–2001), artist
 Arnold Belkin (1930–1992), painter
 Barry Blitt (1958– ), illustrator
 Sam Borenstein (1908–1969), painter
 Ghitta Caiserman-Roth (1923–2005), artist
 Lynne Cohen (1944–2014), photography
 Yehouda Chaki (1938– ), artist
 Sorel Etrog (1933–2014), sculptor
 Albert Gilbert  (1922–2019), photographer 
 Gerald Gladstone (1929–2005), sculptor
 Eric Goldberg (1890–1969), painter
 Jack Goldstein (1945–2003), multimedia artist
 Pnina Granirer (1935– ), painter
 Philip Guston (1913–1980), abstract expressionist
 Gilah Yelin Hirsch (1944– ), artist
 Eli Ilan (1928–1982), sculptor
 Gershon Iskowitz (1921–1988), artist
 Sarah Jackson (1924–2004), artist
 Mayer Kirshenblatt (1916–2009), painter
 Sylvia Lefkovitz (1924–1987), painter and sculptor
 Stanley Lewis (1930–2006), sculptor
 Harry Mayerovitch (1910–2004), artist and architect
 Louis Muhlstock (1904–2001), painter
 Henry Orenstein (1918–2008), painter
 Alfred Pinsky (1921–1999), painter
 David Rabinowitch (1943– ), sculptor
 Royden Rabinowitch  (1943– ), sculptor
 William Raphael (1833–1914), painter
 Miriam Schapiro (1923–2015), artist
 Regina Seiden (1897–1991), painter
 Yechiel Shainblum, (died 1987), painter and sculptor
 Joe Shuster (1914–1992), co-creator of Superman
 Erik Slutsky (1953– ), painter
 Max Stern (1904–1987), art dealer
 Avrom Yanovsky (1911–1979), cartoonist

Business

Finance
 Mitch Garber (1964–), investor and business executive
 Sol Kanee  (1909–2007), banker and Jewish community leader
 Alvin Libin  (1931– ), investor and co-owner of Calgary Sports and Entertainment
 Lazarus Phillips  (1895 –1986), director of the Royal Bank of Canada and senator
 Louis Rasminsky  (1908–1998), Governor of Bank of Canada
 Jeff Rubin (1954– ), chief economist of CIBC World Markets
 Gerry Schwartz  (1941– ), CEO of Onex Corporation
 Alex Shnaider (1968– ), co-founder of the Midland Group
 Lawrence Stroll (1959– ), investor
 Mark Wiseman (1970– ) CEO of the CPP Investment Board

Media

 Izzy Asper  (1932–2003), chairman of Canwest Global Communications
 Leonard Asper (1964– ), president and CEO of Canwest Global Communications
 Avie Bennett  (1928–2017), chairman of McClelland & Stewart
 Jacques Bensimon  (1943–2012), director of the National Film Board of Canada
 Mark Breslin  (1952– ), co-founder of Yuk Yuk's
 Edgar Bronfman Jr. (1955– ), CEO and chairman of Warner Music Group
 Paul Godfrey  (1939– ), president and CEO of Postmedia Network
 Michael Goldbloom  (1953– ), president of Star Media Group
 Ian Greenberg (1942– ), co-founder and CEO of Astral Media
 Michael Hirsh (1948– ), co-founder of Nelvana
 Mel Hurtig  (1932–2016), publisher
 Jonathan Kay (1968– ), editor-in-chief of The Walrus
 Ezra Levant (1972– ), political commentator and founder of Rebel News
 David Margolese (1957– ), founder of Sirius XM Radio
 Louis B. Mayer (1884–1957), co-founder of Metro-Goldwyn-Mayer Studios
 Andy Nulman  (1959– ), co-founder of Just for Laughs
 M. J. Nurenberger (1911–2001), founder of the Canadian Jewish News
 Bernard Ostry  (1927–2006), chair and CEO of TVOntario
 Robert Rabinovitch (1943– ), president and CEO of the Canadian Broadcasting Corporation
 A. M. Rosenthal (1922–2006), executive editor of The New York Times; Pulitzer Prize (1960)
 Brian Segal (1943– ), president and CEO of Rogers Publishing
 Jay Switzer  (1956–2018), president and CEO of CHUM Limited
 Jack L. Warner (1892–1978), president of Warner Bros. Studios
 Moses Znaimer (1942– ), co-founder and head of Citytv
 Mortimer Zuckerman (1937– ), co-founder of Boston Properties and media proprietor

Natural resources
 Robert Friedland (1950– ), founder of Ivanhoe Mines
 Leon Joseph Koerner (1892–1972), philanthropist and industrialist
 Peter Munk  (1927–2018), founder of Barrick Gold
 Joseph Rotman  (1935–2015), businessman and philanthropist
 Seymour Schulich  (1940– ), mining businessman and philanthropist
 Irving Schwartz  (1929–2010), entrepreneur and philanthropist
 Levy Solomons (1730–1792), merchant and fur trader

Philanthropists

 Bluma Appel  (1919–2007), philanthropist
 Jenny Belzberg  (1928– ), philanthropist
 Alfred David Benjamin (1848–1900), businessman and philanthropist
 Lillian Bilsky Freiman  (1885–1940), philanthropist and civil leader
 Ruth Goldbloom  (1923–2012), co-founder of Pier 21

Real estate

 Marcel Adams (1920–2020), real estate investor
 Sylvan Adams (1958– ), real estate investor
 David Azrieli  (1922–2014), real estate magnate
 Samuel Belzberg  (1928–2018), businessman
The Ghermezian family, shopping mall developers
 Mitchell Goldhar (1962– ), founder of SmartCentres and owner of Maccabi Tel Aviv F.C.
 Michal Hornstein  (1920–2016), businessman and philanthropist
 The Reichmann family, real estate magnates
 Edward Reichmann (1925–2005), real estate magnate
 Paul Reichmann (1930–2013), real estate magnate
 Jack Singer (1917–2013), real estate developer
 Allan Zeman  (1949– ), developer

Retail

 Aldo Bensadoun (1939– ), founder of the Aldo Group
 The Bronfman family, businesspeople and philanthropists
 Charles Bronfman  (1931– ), co-chairman of Seagram's
 Edgar Bronfman Sr. (1929–2013), head of Seagram's and president of the World Jewish Congress
 Samuel Bronfman  (1889–1971), founder of Seagram's
 Dov Charney (1969– ), founder of American Apparel
 Lyon Cohen (1868–1937), businessman and philanthropist
 George Cohon  (1937– ), founder of McDonald's Canada
 Nathan Cummings (1896–1985), co-founder of Consolidated Foods
 Leslie Dan  (1929– ), founder of Novopharm
 Sir Mortimer Davis (1866–1928), tobacco industry executive
 Archibald Jacob Freiman (1880–1944), founder of Freimans
 Hershey Friedman (1950– ), owner of Agri Star
 Daniel Friedmann (1956– ), CEO of MacDonald, Dettwiler and Associates
 Daryl Katz (1961– ), founder of Katz Group of Companies and owner of the Edmonton Oilers
 Murray Koffler  (1924–2017), founder of Shoppers Drug Mart
 Ed Mirvish  (1914–2007), founder of Honest Ed's
 Jack Rabinovitch  (1930–2017), philanthropist
 Heather Reisman  (1948– ), founder and CEO of Indigo Books and Music
 Dani Reiss  (1973– ), president and CEO of Canada Goose
 Irv Robbins (1917–2008), co-founder of Baskin-Robbins
 Bruce Rockowitz (1958– ), CEO and vice-chairman of Global Brands Group
 Harry Rosen  (1931– ), founder of Harry Rosen Inc.
 Larry Rosen (1956– ), chairman and CEO of Harry Rosen Inc.
 Calin Rovinescu  (1955– ), president and CEO of Air Canada
 Isai Scheinberg (1946– ), co-founder of PokerStars
 Mark Scheinberg (1973– ), co-founder of PokerStars
 Isadore Sharp  (1931– ), founder and chairman of Four Seasons Hotels and Resorts
 Barry Sherman  (1942–2017), chairman and CEO of Apotex
 Jeffrey Skoll  (1965– ), president of eBay
 Sam Steinberg (1905–1978), president of Steinberg's
 Larry Tanenbaum  (1945– ), chairman of Maple Leaf Sports & Entertainment

Law

Jurists

 Rosalie Abella (1946– ), Supreme Court Justice
 Harry Batshaw (1902–1984), Quebec Superior Court Justice
 Charles Dubin  (1921–2008), Chief Justice of Ontario
 Morris Fish  (1938– ), Supreme Court Justice
 Samuel Freedman  (1908–1993), Chief Justice of Manitoba
 Constance Glube  (1931–2016), Chief Justice of Nova Scotia
 Alan Gold  (1917–2005), Chief Justice of Quebec
 Sydney Harris (1917–2009), judge
 Bora Laskin  (1912–1984), 14th Chief Justice of Canada
 Herbert Marx (1932–2020), Quebec Superior Court Justice and Minister of Justice
 Michael Moldaver (1947– ), Supreme Court Justice
 Nathaniel Nemetz  (1913–1997), Chief Justice of British Columbia
 Marshall Rothstein  (1940– ), Supreme Court Justice
 Tillie Taylor (1922–2011), Saskatchewan's first female magistrate

Lawyers

 Monroe Abbey  (1904–1993), lawyer
 Maurice Alexander (1889–1945), barrister
 Louis Bloomfield (1906–1984), lawyer and businessman
 Alan Borovoy  (1932–2015), lawyer and human rights activist
 Harold Buchwald  (1928–2008), lawyer
 Reuben Cohen  (1921–2014), lawyer and businessman
 Martin Friedland  (1932– ), lawyer
 Rocco Galati (1959– ), constitutional lawyer
 Edward Greenspan (1944–2014), lawyer
 Adolphus Hart (1814–1879), lawyer and activist
 David Matas  (1943– ), human rights lawyer
 Ed Morgan (1955– ), international lawyer
 Harry Rankin (1920–2002), lawyer
 William Schabas  (1950– ), professor of international law
 Morris Shumiatcher  (1917–2004), lawyer and human rights activist
 Harvey Strosberg (1944– ), lawyer
 Harry Walsh  (1913–2011), criminal lawyer
 Benjamin Zimmerman (1862–1923), justice of the peace

Military
 Morris Cohen  (1887–1970), Canadian Expeditionary Force officers and adventurer
 Eleazar David David (1811–1887), cavalry officer
 Ben Dunkelman (1913–1997), World War II and 1948 Arab–Israeli War soldier
 Moe Hurwitz  (1919–1944), World War II soldier
 Maxwell Kogon  (1920–1980), World War II bomber pilot
 Yank Levy (1897–1965), soldier and military instructor
 Gill Rosenberg (1983– ), member of the Women's Protection Units
 Sydney Shulemson  (1915–2007), World War II fighter pilot
 Peter Stevens (RAF officer) (1919–1979), German born WWII RAF officer, and RCAF post-war, best known for multiple POW escapes

Performing arts

Actors and performers

 Harvey Atkin (1942–2017), actor and voice actor
 Aviva Armour-Ostroff, actress and filmmaker<ref name=grief>Amy Grief, "Toronto actor and playwright explores themes of identity". Canadian Jewish News, October 30, 2015.</ref>
 Liane Balaban (1980– ), actress
 Jay Baruchel (1982– ), actor, comedian, and screenwriter
 Frances Bay (1919–2011), character actress
 Lani Billard (1979– ), television actress
 Lionel Blair (1928–2021), actor and choreographer 
 Ben Blue (1901–1975), actor and comedian
 Lloyd Bochner (1924–2005), actor
 Bobby Breen (1927–2016), actor and singer
 Howard Busgang, comedian
 Neve Campbell (1973– ), film and television actress
 Maury Chaykin (1949–2010), actor
 Boris Cherniak (1964– ), hypnotist
 Emmanuelle Chriqui (1975– ), actress
 Lauren Collins (1986– ), television actress
 Pauline Donalda  (1882–1970), operatic soprano
 Barbara Dunkelman (1989– ), actress and internet personality
 Ophira Eisenberg (1972– ), comedian
 Jake Epstein (1987– ), television actor
 Stacey Farber (1987– ), television actress
 Maureen Forrester  (1930–2010), operatic contralto
 Celia Franca  (1921–2007), founder of the National Ballet of Canada
 Victor Garber (1949– ), actor
 Jessalyn Gilsig (1971– ), television actress 
 Joanna Gleason (1950– ), actress
 Jake Goldsbie (1988– ), television actor
 Anais Granofsky (1973– ), actress
 Lorne Greene (1915–1987), actor
 Nathan Fielder (1983– ), actor and comedian 
 Corey Haim (1971–2010), actor
 Monty Hall (1921–2017), game show host
 Melissa Hayden (1923–2006), ballerina
 Lou Jacobi (1913–2009), actor
 Jonathan Keltz (1988– ), actor
 Shane Kippel (1986– ), television actor
 Mia Kirshner (1975– ), actress
 Jack Kruschen (1922–2002), character actor
 Paul Kligman (1923–1985), actor
 Rachelle Lefevre (1979– ), actress
 Sylvia Lennick (1915–2009), actress
 Caissie Levy (1981– ), stage actress and singer
 Eugene Levy  (1946– ), actor and director
 Jaclyn Linetsky (1986–2003), television actress
 Mary Livingstone (1905–1983), radio comedian and actress
 Howie Mandel (1955– ), actor and comedian
 Rick Moranis (1953– ), actor and comedian
 Harley Morenstein (1985–), actor and Internet personality
 Irene Pavloska (1889–1962), mezzo-soprano
 Gloria Reuben (1964– ), television actress
 Spencer Rice (1963– ), writer, director and performer
 Seth Rogen (1982– ), film and television actor
 Sasha Roiz (1973– ), actor
 Saul Rubinek (1948– ), actor, director, producer and playwright
 Jonathan Sagall (1959– ), actor
 Mort Sahl (1927–2021), stand-up comedian 
 William Shatner  (1931– ), actor, director, and writer
 Norma Shearer (1902–1983), actress and Hollywood star
 Frank Shuster  (1916–2002), comedian
 Anna Silk (1974– ), actress
 David Steinberg  (1942– ), comedian and director
 Stuart Stone (1980– ), actor
 Tara Strong (1973– ), actress
 Kyle Switzer (1985– ), television actor
 Theresa Tova (1955– ), actress and playwright
 Al Waxman  (1935–2001), actor
 Johnny Wayne (1918–1990), comedian
 Joseph Wiseman (1918–2009), theatre and film actor
 Finn Wolfhard (2002– ), actor

Directors and producers

 Barry Avrich (1963– ), television producer and film director
 Laszlo Barna (1948– ), television producer 
 Murray Cohl  (1929–2008), film director
 David Cronenberg  (1943– ), filmmaker and screenwriter
 Garth Drabinsky (1949– ), film and theatrical producer 
 Bob Ezrin (1949– ), music producer
 Ken Finkleman (1946– ), television producer
 Jay Firestone (1956– ), film and television producer
 Sidney Furie (1933– ), film director
 Herman Geiger-Torel  (1907–1976), opera director
 Jake Gold (1958– ), musician manager
 Harold Greenberg  (1930–1996), film producer
 Al Guest (1933– ), animation producer and director
 Arthur Hiller  (1923–2016), director
 John Hirsch  (1930–1989), theatre director
 Kenny Hotz (1967– ), producer and entertainer
 Simcha Jacobovici (1953– ), film director
 Estelle Klein (1930–2004), artistic director
 Franz Kraemer  (1914–1999), radio producer
 Shawn Levy (1968– ), film director and producer 
 Avi Lewis (1968– ), documentary filmmaker and television host
 Benjamin Lumley (1811–1875), opera director
 Francis Mankiewicz (1944–1993), director
 Lorne Michaels  (1944– ), television producer
 David Mirvish  (1944– ), theatre producer
 Sydney Newman  (1917–1997), producer
Noah Pink, screenwriter and television producer
 Jeremy Podeswa (1962– ), film and television director
 Ivan Reitman  (1946–2022), film producer and director
 Jason Reitman (1977– ), film director
 J.R. Rotem (1975– ), record producer
 Albert Ruddy (1930– ), film director 
 Harry Saltzman (1915–1994), film producer
 Dora Wasserman (1919–2003), playwright and theater director

Composers

 Murray Adaskin  (1906–2002), composer
 Karel Ančerl (1908–1973), conductor
 István Anhalt  (1919–2012), composer
 Louis Applebaum  (1918–2000), film score composer
 Milton Barnes (1931–2001), composer and conductor
 Boris Berlin  (1907–2001), musical instructor and composer
 David Botwinik (1920–2022), composer
 Alexander Brott  (1915–2005), conductor and composer
 Boris Brott  (1944– ), conductor
 Percy Faith (1908–1976), bandleader
 Harry Freedman  (1922–2005), composer
 Lewis Furey (1949– ), composer
 Srul Glick  (1934–2002), composer
 Helmut Kallmann (1918–1985), composer
 Uri Mayer (1946– ), conductor and violinist
 Oskar Morawetz  (1917–2007), composer
 Albert Pratz (1914–1995), conductor and violinist
 Paul Shaffer  (1949– ), bandleader
 Howard Shore  (1946– ), composer
 Ben Steinberg (1930– ), composer and conductor
 Heinz Unger (1895–1965), conductor
 Maurice Zbriger (1896–1981), composer and violinist

Musicians

Classical
 Frances Adaskin  (1900–2001), pianist
 Harry Adaskin  (1901–1994), violinist
 Ellen Ballon (1898–1969), pianist
 Denis Brott  (1950– ), cellist
 Rivka Golani (1946– ), viola player
 Moshe Hammer (1946– ), violinist
 Ofra Harnoy  (1965– ), cellist
 Jacques Israelievitch  (1948–2015), violinist
 Minuetta Kessler (1914–2002), concert pianist
 Anton Kuerti  (1938– ), pianist
 Zara Nelsova (1918–2002), cellist
 Isidor Philipp (1863–1958), pianist and composer
 Ezra Schabas  (1924–2020), musician
 Harold Sumberg (1905–1994), violinist
 Ethel Stark  (1910–2012), violinist and conductor
 John Weinzweig  (1913–2006), composer
 George Zukerman  (1927– ), bassoonist and impresario

Jazz
 Paul Bley  (1932–2016), pianist
 Jim Gelcer (1961– ), jazz musician
 James Gelfand (1959– ), jazz pianist
 Moe Koffman  (1928–2001), jazz musician
 Sophie Milman (1983– ), jazz musician
 Nikki Yanofsky (1994– ), jazz-pop singer
Nava Wolfish (2003-), Awesome super cool person who is the best person in the whole world and future winner of a nobel prize in physics. Best njg out there. it's true because wikipedia said it.

Popular
 A-Trak (1982– ), DJ
 Oscar Brand (1920–2016), folk singer
 Drake (1986– ), rapper and actor
 Corey Hart (1962– ), singer
 Paul Hoffert  (1943– ), founding member of Lighthouse
 Geddy Lee  (1953– ), lead singer of Rush
 Efrim Menuck (1971– ), musician
 Ben Mink (1951– ), songwriter and musician
 Steven Page (1970– ), founding member of Barenaked Ladies
 Peaches (1966– ), electronic musician
 Robbie Robertson  (1943– ), lead guitarist of The Band
 Eddie Schwartz  (1949– ), songwriter and music producer
 Sharon, Lois & Bram, children's music group
 Amy Sky (1960– ), singer-songwriter
 Socalled, rapper and producer
 Chaim Tannenbaum, folk singer
 Vanity (1959–2016), singer-songwriter
 David Usher (1966– ), frontman for Moist
 Bob Wiseman (1962– ), composer and founding member of Blue Rodeo
 Zal Yanovsky (1944–2002), rock musician, the Lovin' Spoonful guitarist
 Alissa White-Gluz (1985– ), death metal vocalist

Politics
Diplomats
 Klaus Goldschlag  (1922–2012), ambassador
 Allan Gotlieb  (1928–2020), ambassador
 Saul Rae (1914–1999), diplomat
 Norman Spector (1949– ), diplomat and journalist
 Kaiser King (2023 -), Diplomat. Son of the Jewish Ambassador for the 2016 MAGA Rally, Steven King 

Mayors

 Michael Applebaum (1963– ), mayor of Montreal
 Sidney Buckwold  (1916–2001), mayor of Saskatoon
 Martin Dobkin (1942– ), first mayor of Mississauga
 Lumley Franklin (1808–1873), mayor of Victoria
 Philip Givens (1922–1995), mayor of Toronto and Liberal MP
 Lorry Greenberg (1933–1999), mayor of Ottawa
 Sam Katz (1951– ), mayor of Winnipeg
 Leonard Arthur Kitz (1916–2006), mayor of Halifax
 Mel Lastman (1933–2021), mayor of Toronto
 Saul Laskin (1918–2008), mayor of Thunder Bay
 Stephen Mandel (1945– ), mayor of Edmonton and leader of the Alberta Party
 Danny Nathanson, mayor of New Waterford, Nova Scotia
 David Oppenheimer (1834–1897), mayor of Vancouver
 Nathan Phillips (1892–1976), mayor of Toronto
 Harvey Rosen (1949– ), mayor of Kingston
 Morley Rosenberg (1937– ), mayor of Kitchener
 Stephen Mandel (1945-),mayor of Edmonton

Politicians

 Jack Austin  (1932– ), senator and cabinet minister
 Dave Barrett  (1930–2018), 26th Premier of British Columbia
 George Benjamin (1799–1864), Conservative MP
 Peter Bercovitch (1879–1942), Liberal MP and Quebec Liberal MNA
 Lawrence Bergman (1940– ), Quebec Liberal MNA and cabinet minister
 Harry Blank (1925– ), Quebec Liberal MPP
 Annie Buller (1895–1973), co-founder of the Communist Party of Canada

 Elinor Caplan (1944– ), Liberal MP and cabinet minister 
 Jim Carr, Liberal MP and Minister of Natural Resources
 Leon Crestohl (1900–1963), Liberal MP
 Saul Cherniack  (1917–2018), Manitoba NDP MP and cabinet minister
 Tony Clement (1961– ), Minister of Industry and Minister of Health
 Irwin Cotler  (1940– ), Liberal MP and Minister of Justice
 David Croll (1900–1991), senator and Liberal MP
 Julie Dabrusin (1971– ), Liberal MP
 Barney Danson  (1921–2011), Liberal MP and Minister of National Defence
 Samuel Factor (1892–1962), first Jewish MP elected in Ontario
 Sheila Finestone (1927–2009), Liberal MP and senator

 Myra Freeman  (1949– ), 29th Lieutenant Governor of Nova Scotia
 Linda Frum (1963– ), senator
 Irving Gerstein  (1941– ), senator and businessman
 Marc Gold (1950– ), senator and law professor
 Carl Goldenberg  (1907–1996), senator
 Victor Goldbloom  (1923–2016), Quebec Liberal MNA and doctor
 Yoine Goldstein (1934–2020), senator
 Karina Gould (1987– ), Liberal MP and Minister of Democratic Institutions
 Herb Gray  (1931–2014), Liberal MP and Deputy Prime Minister
 Larry Grossman (1943–1997), leader of the Ontario PC Party
 Ezekiel Hart (1770–1843), first Jew elected to a Canadian Parliament
 Solomon Hart Green (1885–1969), first Jew to sit in a provincial legislature
 Stanley Hartt  (1937–2018), Chief of Staff
 Sharren Haskel (1984– ), Likud MK
 Chaviva Hošek  (1946– ), academic and politician
 Anthony Housefather (1971– ), Liberal MP and mayor of Côte Saint-Luc
 Samuel William Jacobs (1871–1938), Liberal MP and Jewish community leader
 Monte Kwinter (1931– ), Ontario Liberal MPP and cabinet minister
 Melissa Lantsman (1984—), first Jewish woman elected as a Conservative MP
 Michael Levitt, Liberal MP
 David Lewis  (1909–1981), NDP leader and MP
 Stephen Lewis  (1937– ), Ontario NDP leader, MP and ambassador
 Jack Marshall  (1919–2004), PC MP and senator
 Tom Marshall (1946– ), 11th Premier of Newfoundland and Labrador

 Arthur Mitchell, leader of the Yukon Liberal Party
 Marty Morantz (1962– ), Conservative MP
 Nicolas Muzin, political strategist
 Henry Nathan Jr. (1842–1914), first Jew elected to the House of Commons
 Joe Oliver (1940– ), Conservative MP and Minister of Finance
 Annamie Paul, leader of the Green Party of Canada
 Bob Rae (1948–), Leader of the Liberal Party of Canada and 21st Premier of Ontario
 Simon Reisman  (1991–2008), civil servant
 Fred Rose (1907–1983), Labour–Progressive MP and Soviet spy
 Jacques Saada (1947– ), Liberal MP and cabinet minister
 Hugh Segal  (1950– ), senator
 Morton Shulman  (1925–2000), Ontario PC and NDP MPP
 Peter Shurman (1947– ), Ontario PC MPP
 Mira Spivak (1934– ), senator
 Sidney Spivak (1928–2002), leader of the Manitoba PC Party
 Maitland Steinkopf  (1912–1970), first Jewish cabinet minister in Manitoba
 Hunter Tootoo (1963– ), Liberal MP
 Gerry Weiner (1933– ), PC MP
 Dov Yosef (1899–1980), Israeli minister

Religious leaders

 Reuven Bulka  (1944–2021), rabbi and writer
 Jacob Raphael Cohen (1738–1811), rabbi
 Solomon Frank (1900–1982), synagogue rabbinical leader in Winnipeg and Montreal
 Simon Glazer (1876–1938), rabbi
 Elyse Goldstein, Reform rabbi
 Joan Friedman, first female rabbi in Canada
 Yitzchak Hendel (1916–2007), Lubavitch rabbi
 Sheea Herschorn (1893–1969), Chief Rabbi of Montreal
 Pinhas Hirschprung (1912–1998), Chief Rabbi of Montreal
 Solomon Jacobs (1861–1920), rabbi
 Israel Isaac Kahanovitch (1872–1945), Chief Rabbi of Winnipeg
 Meshulim Feish Lowy (1921–2015), Tosher Rebbe
 Gunther Plaut  (1912–2012), rabbi and author
 Avraham Aharon Price (1900–1994), Chief Rabbi of Toronto
 Nahum Rabinovitch (1928–2020), rabbi and posek
 Eli Rubenstein (1959– ), rabbi and Holocaust educator
 Erwin Schild  (1920– ), rabbi
 Jacob Immanuel Schochet (1935–2013), rabbi and scholar
 Shmuel Abba Twersky (1872–1947), Makarover Rebbe
 Joseph Weinreb (1869–1943), Chief Rabbi of Toronto

Writers

Authors

 David Albahari (1948– ), novelist
 Sue Ann Alderson (1940– ), children's novelist
 Lisa Appignanesi  (1946– ), writer and novelist
 Isidore Gordon Ascher (1835–1914), novelist and poet
 Saul Bellow (1915–2005), writer; Nobel Prize in Literature (1976), Pulitzer Prize (1976)
 David Berman, (1962–), graphic designer, author
 David Bezmozgis (1973– ), author
 Martha Blum (1913–2007), writer
 Matt Cohen (1942–1999), novelist and children's writer
 Cory Doctorow (1971– ), science fiction author and blogger
 Sheila Fischman  (1937– ), translator
 Phoebe Gilman (1940–2002), children's author
 Adam Gopnik (1956– ), writer and essayist
 Phyllis Gotlieb (1926–2009), science fiction novelist
 Charles Yale Harrison (1898–1954), novelist
 Sheila Heti (1976– ), novelist
 George Jonas  (1935–2016), writer and journalist
 Guy Gavriel Kay  (1954– ), fantasy writer
 Naïm Kattan  (1928–2021), novelist and essayist
 Naomi Klein (1970– ), author and filmmaker
 Eric Koch (1919–2018), author, broadcaster and academic
 Gordon Korman (1963– ), children's and young adult fiction writer
 Henry Kreisel  (1922–1991), writer and novelist
 Allan Levine (1956– ), historian and novelist
 Norman Levine (1923–2005), writer and poet
 Shar Levine  (1953– ), children's author
 Jack Ludwig (1922–2018), novelist and sportswriter
 Seymour Mayne (1944– ), author and poet
 Judith Merril (1923–1997), science fiction writer
 Anne Michaels (1958– ), poet and novelist
 Sarah Mlynowski (1977– ), writer
 Alison Pick (1975– ), novelist
 David Rakoff (1964–2012), author
 Edeet Ravel (1955– ), novelist
 Mordecai Richler  (1931–2001), author and essayist
 Nancy Richler (1957–2018), novelist
 Joel Rosenberg (1954–2011), science fiction author
 Chava Rosenfarb (1923–2011), author and poet
 Gail Simmons (1976– ), food writer
 Mariko Tamaki (1975– ), graphic novelist
 Morley Torgov  (1927– ), novelist
 Aren X. Tulchinsky (1958– ), author and screenwriter
 Eleanor Wachtel  (1947– ), writer and broadcaster
 William Weintraub (1926–2017), author
 Michael Wex (1954– ), novelist
 Adele Wiseman (1928–1992), author
 Hirsch Wolofsky (1878–1949), Yiddish author
 Shulamis Yelin (1913–2002), writer and teacher

Journalists and broadcasters

 Barbara Amiel (1940– ), journalist
 Sonia Benezra (1960– ), television and radio interviewer
 David Brooks (1961– ), political commentator
 Andrew Cohen (1955– ), journalist
 Nathan Cohen (1923–1971), theatre critic, broadcaster
 Michael Coren (1959– ), columnist and talk show host
 Red Fisher  (1926–2018), sports journalist
 Josh Freed, columnist
 Barbara Frum  (1937–1992), journalist
 David Frum (1960– ), political commentator
 Eli Glasner, entertainment reporter
 Ian Halperin (1964– ), investigative journalist
 Ken Hechtman (1967– ), journalist
 Ariel Helwani (1982– ), mixed martial arts journalist
 Simma Holt  (1922–2015), journalist and politician
 Barbara Kay (1943– ), columnist
 Jonah Keri (1974– ), sports writer
 Karin Kloosterman, journalist
 Charles Krauthammer (1950–2018), columnist
 Michele Landsberg  (1939– ), journalist and feminist activist
 Dahlia Lithwick, senior editor at Slate''
 Jonathan Mann (1960– ), journalist
 Peter Newman  (1929– ), journalist
 Hal Niedzviecki (1971– ), writer
 Steve Paikin  (1960– ), journalist and author
 Abraham Rhinewine (1887–1932), journalist
 Carol Rosenberg, journalist
 Morley Safer (1931–2016), broadcast journalist and reporter
 Percy Saltzman   (1915–2007), weather forecaster
 Joe Schlesinger  (1928–2019), journalist
 Lionel Shapiro (1908–1958), journalist and novelist
 Dan Shulman (1967– ), sportscaster
 Evan Solomon (1968– ), journalist
 Larry Zolf (1934–2011), journalist

Poets

 Elizabeth Brewster  (1922–2012), poet
 Leonard Cohen  (1934–2016), poet and singer-songwriter
 Adeena Karasick (1965– ), poet
 A. M. Klein (1909–1972), poet and novelist
 Rachel Korn (1898–1982), poet and author
 Aaron Kreuter
 Irving Layton  (1912–2006), poet
 Eli Mandel (1922–1992), poet
 Ida Maze (1893–1962), Yiddish poet 
 Melech Ravitch, (1893–1976), Yiddish poet
 Joe Rosenblatt (1933–2019), poet
 Gregory Scofield (1966– ), poet
 Esther Segal (1895–1974), Yiddish poet
 J. I. Segal (1896–1954), Yiddish poet
 Joseph Sherman   (1945–2006), poet
 Sholem Shtern (1907–1990), Yiddish poet
 Mark Strand (1934–2014), poet and essayist
 Miriam Waddington (1917–2004), poet
 Tom Wayman (1945– ), poet
 Yudika (1898–1988), Yiddish poet

Screenwriters and playwrights
 Ted Allan (1916–1995), screenwriter and playwright
 Ben Barzman (1910–1989), screenwriter
 Len Blum (1951– ), screenwriter
 Joel H. Cohen, television writer
 Robert Cohen, comedy writer
 Stan Daniels (1934–2007), screenwriter, director, and producer
 Evan Goldberg (1982– ), screenwriter
 Elan Mastai (1974– ), screenwriter
 Hannah Moscovitch (1978– ), playwright
 Sharon Pollock  (1936–2021), playwright
 Oren Safdie (1965– ), playwright
 Rick Salutin (1942– ), playwright
 Adam Seelig (1975– ), playwright
 David Shore (1959– ), television writer
 Beverley Simons (1938– ), playwright
 Sandor Stern (1936– ), screenwriter
 Mel Tolkin (1913–2007), television comedy writer

Sports

Athletics

 Sasha Gollish (1981– ), competitive runner
 Abby Hoffman  (1947– ), track and field athlete
 Gordon Orlikow (born 1960), decathlon, heptathlon, and hurdles competitor, Athletics Canada Chairman, Canadian Olympic Committee member, Korn/Ferry International partner
 Bobbie Rosenfeld (1904—1969), runner and long jumper

Baseball
 Goody Rosen (1912–1994), baseball player, outfielder, All-Star
 Adam Stern (1980– ), baseball player, outfielder

Basketball
 Doodie Bloomfield (1918–1950), basketball player
 Julius Goldman (1910–2001), basketball player
 Bennie Lands (1921–2014), basketball player
 Irving Meretsky (1912–2006), basketball player
 Mendy Morein (1926–2003), basketball player
 Cy Strulovitch (1925–2020), basketball player
 Sol Tolchinsky (1929–2020), basketball
 Murray Waxman (1925– ), basketball

Canadian football

 Sam Berger  (1900–1992), president of the CFL
 Noah Cantor (1971– ), CFL player
 Mark Cohon (1966– ), CFL Commissioner
 Sydney Halter  (1905–1990), CFL Commissioner
 Lew Hayman (1908–1984), Toronto Argonauts and Montreal Alouettes coach

Chess

 Jacob Ascher (1841–1912), chess master
 Mark Bluvshtein (1988– ), chess grandmaster
 Nathan Divinsky (1925–2012), chess master
 Selim Franklin (1814–1885), chess master
 Sofia Polgar (1974– ), chess grandmaster
 Daniel Yanofsky  (1925–2000), Canada's first chess grandmaster

Combat sports

 Mark Berger (1954– ), judoka, Olympic silver & bronze (heavyweight)
 Maxie Berger (1917–2000), boxer
 Eddie Creatchman (1928–1994), wrestler and manager
 Al Foreman (1904–1954), boxer
 Sarah Kaufman (1985– ), mixed martial artist
 Sammy Luftspring (1916–2000), boxer, Canadian champion welterweight, Canada's Sports Hall of Fame
 Fred Oberlander (1911–1996), wrestler; world champion (freestyle heavyweight); Maccabiah champion
 Lanny Poffo (1954– ), wrestler
 Irving Ungerman (1923–2015), boxing promoter and manager
 David Zilberman (1982– ), freestyle wrestler

Figure skating

 Ellen Burka  (1921–2016), figure skater
 Petra Burka (1946– ), figure skater
 Dylan Moscovitch (1984– ), pairs skater
 Louis Rubenstein (1861–1931), world figure skating champion

Hockey

 Murray Bannerman (1957– ), ice hockey, goaltender (NHL)
 Ross Brooks (1937– ), ice hockey, goaltender (NHL)
 Hy Buller (1926–1968), ice hockey, All-Star defenceman (NHL)
 Michael Cammalleri (1982– ), ice hockey, left wing (New Jersey Devils)
 Jason Demers (1988– ), ice hockey defenseman (Arizona Coyotes)
 Steve Dubinsky (1970– ), ice hockey, centre (NHL)
 Oren Eizenman (1985– ), ice hockey centre
 Kaleigh Fratkin (1992– ), ice hockey defenseman (Metropolitan Riveters) 
 Mark Friedman (1995– ), ice hockey, NHL
 Cecil Hart (1883–1940), Montreal Canadiens coach and namesake of the Hart Memorial Trophy 
 Adam Henrich (1984– ), ice hockey, left wing/centre (Serie A)
 Michael Henrich (1980– ), ice hockey, right wing, first Jewish player drafted in first round to the NHL
 Eric Himelfarb (1983– ), ice hockey centre (HC Thurgau) 
 Corey Hirsch (1972– ), ice hockey, goaltender (NHL)
 Josh Ho-Sang (1996– ), ice hockey forward (New York Islanders)
 Zach Hyman (1992– ), ice hockey left wing/centre (Edmonton Oilers)
 Joe Ironstone (1898–1972), ice hockey goaltender (NHL)
 Max Labovitch (1924–2018), ice hockey, right wing (NHL)
 Brendan Leipsic (1994– ), ice hockey left wing (Vancouver Canucks)
 Devon Levi (2001– ), ice hockey, goaltender (Northeastern Huskies, Canada men's national junior ice hockey team)
 Alex Levinsky (1910–1990), ice hockey, defenceman (NHL)
 Jacob Micflikier (1984– ), ice hockey forward (EHC Biel)
 David Nemirovsky (1976– ), ice hockey, right wing (CSKA Moscow)
 Bob Nystrom (1952– ), ice hockey, right wing (NHL)
 Eric Nystrom (1983– ), ice hockey, left wing (NHL)
 Cory Pecker (1981– ), ice hockey, right wing (NHL, Nationalliga B)
 Bob Plager (1943–2021), ice hockey defense (NHL)
 Samuel Rothschild (1899–1987), ice hockey left wing (NHL)
 Eliezer Sherbatov (1991– ), ice hockey, left wing (KHL)
 Max Silverman (1900–1966), ice hockey manager
 Trevor Smith (1985– ), ice hockey, centre (Toronto Maple Leafs)
 Ronnie Stern (1967– ), ice hockey, right wing (NHL)
 Josh Tordjman (1985– ), ice hockey goaltender (EC Red Bull Salzburg)
 Mike Veisor (1952– ), ice hockey, goaltender (NHL)
 Stephen Weiss (1983– ), ice hockey, forward (Detroit Red Wings, NHL)
 Ethan Werek (1991– ), ice hockey, forward (OHL, NHL)
 Bernie Wolfe (1951– ), ice hockey, goaltender
 Larry Zeidel (1928–2014), ice hockey defenceman (NHL)

Racing

 Tanya Dubnicoff (1969– ), track cyclist
 Leah Goldstein (1969– ), road racing cyclist
 Yonnie Starr (1905–1990), racehorse trainer
 Lance Stroll (1998– ), Formula One driver

Racket sports

 Sharon Fichman (1990– ), tennis player
 Sherman Greenfeld (1962– ), racquetball player
 Jesse Levine (1987– ), Canadian-American tennis player
 Denis Shapovalov (1999– ), tennis player
 Andrew Sznajder (1967– ), tennis player

Soccer
 Adam Braz (1981– ), former professional soccer player
 Tomer Chencinski (1984– ), Israeli-Canadian soccer player
 Gottfried Fuchs (1889–1972), soccer (German national team)
 Daniel Haber (1992– ), soccer player
 Samuel Hazan (1983– ), soccer player
 Frederick Stambrook (1929–2005), president of the Canadian Soccer Association

Other
 Josh Binstock (1981– ), beach volleyball player
 Sam Schachter (1990– ), beach volleyball player
 Ben Weider  (1923–2008), bodybuilder and entrepreneur
 Joe Weider (1919–2013), bodybuilder and entrepreneur

See also
 History of the Jews in Canada
 Lists of Jews
 Lists of Canadians

References 

Canadian Jews
Jews
Jews,Canadian